Darling is a term of endearment of Old English origin.

Darling or Darlin'  or Darlings may also refer to:

People
Darling (surname)
Darling Jimenez (born 1980), American boxer
Darling Légitimus (1907–1999), French actress

Places

Australia
Darling Downs, a region in Queensland, Australia
Darling Harbour, Sydney, Australia
Darling Heights, Queensland
Darling Point, New South Wales
Darling River
Darling Scarp, an escarpment in Western Australia
Darling Street, Balmain, Sydney
Darling railway station, Melbourne

Canada
Darling, Alberta

Nepal
Darling, Baglung, a Village Development Committee (administrative region)
Darling, Lumbini, a village and municipality

United States
Darling, Arizona (disambiguation)
Darling, Mississippi, a census-designated place
Darling, Pennsylvania, a ghost town
Darling Run, a stream in Ohio

Elsewhere
Darling, Chin State, Burma/Myanmar
Darling, South Africa
Darling Peninsula, Nunavut, Canada
Darling Township (disambiguation)

Films
 Darling (1961 film), a Spanish-West German comedy film
 Darling (1965 film), a British film directed by John Schlesinger
 Darling (2007 Indian film), a Bollywood film starring Fardeen Khan
 Darling (2007 Swedish film), directed by Johan Kling
 Darling (2007 French film), starring Marina Foïs, directed by Christine Carrière
 Darling (2010 film), a Telugu film starring Prabhas
 Darling (2012 film), a Bengali film
 Darling (2014 film), a 2014 Kannada film
 Darling (2015 Tamil film), a Tamil film
 Darling (2015 American film), an American horror film
 Darlin (2019 film), an American film
 Darling (2021 film), a Marathi Indian film directed by Ritika Shrotri
 Darlings (film), a 2022 Indian film
 Darling! The Pieter–Dirk Uys Story, a 2007 documentary by Julian Shaw

Music
Darlin' (French band), a short-lived French band that eventually became Daft Punk
Darling (British band), a British band featuring guitarist Hal Lindes and drummer Paul Varley
Darling, a band fronted by former Calibretto 13 drummer Christopher Thomas

Albums
Darling (Robert Hazard album), 1986
Darling (EP), a 2007 promotional EP by Kylie Minogue
Darling (Yui Horie album), 2008
Darlings (Kevin Drew album), 2014
Darlin, a 1981 album by Tom Jones

Songs
"Darlin (The Beach Boys song) (1967)
"Darlin (Poacher song) (1970)
"Darlin (Roch Voisine song) (1991)
"Oh! Darling", by the Beatles (1969)
"Darling", by Stories (1973)
"Darling", by Baccara Soja, Dostal (1977)
"Darling", by Cindy & Bert (1979)
"Darling", by Nazar, (1978)
"Darlin'", by Backstreet Boys from their eponymous album (1996)
"Darling", by Golden Earring from the album Paradise in Distress (1999)
"Darling", a song by V6 (2003)
"Darling", by Sons and Daughters (2008)
"Darling", by Eyes Set to Kill (2009)
"Darlin", by Avril Lavigne from the album Goodbye Lullaby (2011)
"Darling", a song by Kana Nishino (2014)
"Darling", by Girl's Day from the album Girl's Day Everyday 4 (2014)
"Darling", by Real Estate from the album In Mind (2017)
"Darling", by Taeyang from the album White Night (2017)
"Darling", a song by Needtobreathe (2018)
"Darling", by Halsey from the album If I Can't Have Love, I Want Power (2021)
"Darling", by Lee Hi from the album 4 Only (2021)
"Darling", by Zach Bryan from the album American Heartbreak (2022)

Other uses
Darling (Blackadder), a character in the British sitcom Blackadder
Darling (fragrance), promoted by Kylie Minogue
Darling (magazine), a quarterly women’s magazine
Darling (software), an open source Darwin / OS X compatibility layer for Linux
Darling: New & Selected Poems, by Jackie Kay
Darling language, an aboriginal language of the Darling River in Australia
Darling, an early automobile model manufactured by Neue Automobil Gesellschaft
Darling, an automobile model manufactured from 1901 to 1902; see List of defunct automobile manufacturers of the United States
The Darlings, recurring characters on the American television series The Andy Griffith Show

See also
Darling House (disambiguation), various buildings on the US National Register of Historic Places
Darling Darling (disambiguation)
The Darling (disambiguation)